Geranyl diphosphate 2-C-methyltransferase (SCO7701, GPP methyltransferase, GPPMT, 2-methyl-GPP synthase, MGPPS, geranyl pyrophosphate methyltransferase) is an enzyme with systematic name S-adenosyl-L-methionine:geranyl-diphosphate 2-C-methyltransferase. This enzyme catalyses the following chemical reaction

 S-adenosyl-L-methionine + geranyl diphosphate  S-adenosyl-L-homocysteine + (E)-2-methylgeranyl diphosphate

This enzyme takes part in synthesis of 2-methylisoborneol.

References

External links 
 

EC 2.1.1